"Sorry" is a single by Jamaican singer and actress Grace Jones, released in 1976.

Background
"Sorry" was Jones' second single, released before her international breakthrough, on the Orfeus label in France and Beam Junction in the US. The single B-side was "That's the Trouble", which was later released as an A-side track. In certain territories the single was released as a double A-side single. Both songs later appeared on Jones' debut album Portfolio; 7" version of "Sorry" and an alternate mix of "That's the Trouble" were placed there. Both the original single version and the instrumental of "That's the Trouble"  remain unreleased on CD. The extended 12" mixes of both tracks were released on Grace's box set Disco.

Track listing

"Sorry"
7" single (1976)
A. "Sorry" – 3:58
B. "That's the Trouble" – 3:30

12" single (1976)
A. "Sorry" – 6:42
B. "That's the Trouble" – 7:02

"That's the Trouble"
12" single (1976)
A. "That's the Trouble" – 7:02
B. "Sorry" – 6:43

7" single (1977)
A. "That's the Trouble" – 3:36
B. "Sorry" – 4:00

Chart performance

References

1976 singles
Grace Jones songs
Songs written by Grace Jones